George Bollinger may refer to:

 George Frederick Bollinger (1770–1842), settler in Missouri
 George Wallace Bollinger (1890–1917), New Zealand soldier and diarist